The 2004 NCAA Division III football season, part of the college football season organized by the NCAA at the Division III level in the United States, began in August 2004, and concluded with the NCAA Division III Football Championship, also known as the Stagg Bowl, in December 2004 at Salem Football Stadium in Salem, Virginia. The Linfield Wildcats won their first Division III championship by defeating the Mary Hardin–Baylor Crusaders, 28−21.

The Gagliardi Trophy, given to the most outstanding player in Division III football, was awarded to Rocky Myers, safety from Wesley (DE).

Conference changes and new programs

Conference standings

Conference champions

Postseason
The 2004 NCAA Division III Football Championship playoffs were the 32nd annual single-elimination tournament to determine the national champion of men's NCAA Division III college football. The championship Stagg Bowl game was held at Salem Football Stadium in Salem, Virginia for the 12th time. This was the last bracket to feature 28 teams before expanding to 32 teams in 2005.

Playoff bracket

* Overtime

Final D3football.com Poll

Others receiving votes: Mount St. Joseph 39, Trinity (Conn.) 33, Alma 31, UW-Eau Claire 30, Whitworth 17, Texas Lutheran 17, Aurora 16, Augustana 16, Muhlenberg 14, Johns Hopkins 12, Springfield 9, Shenandoah 9, Hampden-Sydney 9, Moravian 8, Albright 3, Capital 2, Waynesburg 1, New Jersey 1, Curry 1, McDaniel 1.

Awards
Gagliardi Trophy: Rocky Myers, Wesley (DE)

AFCA Coach of the Year: Jay Locey, Linfield

AFCA Regional Coach of the Year: Region 1: Chuck Priore, Trinity College (Conn.)  Region 2: G.A. Mangus, Delaware Valley College Region 3: Jimmie Keeling, Hardin-Simmons University Region 4: Tim Rucks, Carthage College Region 5: Terry Horan, Concordia-Moorhead College (Minn.)

See also
2004 NCAA Division I-A football season
2004 NCAA Division I-AA football season
2004 NCAA Division II football season

References